Sixto is a Spanish name. It may refer to:

People with the given name 
 Sixto Brillantes (1939–2020), Filipino election lawyer
 Sixto Casanovas (1802–1852), Argentine cavalry officer, politician
 Sixto Durán Ballén (1921–2016), Ecuadorian architect, president
 Sixto Escobar (1913–1979), Puerto Rican professional boxer
 Sixto González (born 1965), Puerto Rican astronomer, director of the Arecibo Observatory
 Sixto Lezcano (born 1953), Puerto Rican born baseball outfielder
 Sixto López (1863–1947), Philippine activist, diplomat
 Sixto Palavecino (born 1915), Argentine poet, folk musician
 Sixto Peralta (born 1979), Argentine football midfielder
 Sixto Rodriguez (born 1942), American singer-songwriter
 Sixto Sánchez (born 1998), Dominican born baseball player
 Sixto Soria (born 1954), Cuban boxer
 Sixto Valencia Burgos (1934–2015), Mexican cartoon artist 
 Sixto Vizuete (born 1961), Ecuadorian football coach

People with the surname 
 Maurice Sixto (1919–1984), Haitian author

Spanish masculine given names